"Take Your Shoes Off" is a song by Romanian pop duo the Cheeky Girls. It was released as a single on 5 May 2003 in the United Kingdom. The single debuted at a peak position of number three in the UK Singles Chart and also reached the top 40 in Flanders and Ireland.

Track listings
UK CD1
 "Take Your Shoes Off" (radio edit) – 2:56
 "Take Your Shoes Off" (LMC club mix) – 5:52
 "Take Your Shoes Off" (original extended mix) – 5:58
 "Take Your Shoes Off" (video)

UK CD2
 "Take Your Shoes Off" (radio edit) – 2:56
 "Take Your Shoes Off" (Lockout mix) – 5:47
 "Take Your Shoes Off" (LMC dub mix) – 5:12

UK cassette single
 "Take Your Shoes Off" (radio edit) – 2:56
 "Take Your Shoes Off" (LMC club mix) – 5:52

Charts

Weekly charts

Year-end charts

References

2003 singles
2003 songs
The Cheeky Girls songs
Multiply Records singles
Number-one singles in Scotland